TKB can refer to:

 The MIPT Terrorism Knowledge Base, commonly abbreviated as TKB.
 Ting Kau Bridge, a cable-stayed bridge in Hong Kong
 TKB, the TasKBuilder program for the RSX-11 computer operating system.

TKB (Tulskoye Konstruktorskoye Byuro / Tula Design Bureau) is the prefix for a series of weapons created by TsKIB SOO:
 TKB-09/010
 TKB-011
 TKB-022PM
 TKB-059
 TKB-072
 TKB-408
 TKB-506
 TKB-517
 TKB-523
 TKB-0146
 TKB-0216